Donazzan is an Italian surname. Notable people with the surname include:

Elena Donazzan (born 1972), Italian politician
Nicola Donazzan (born 1985), Italian footballer

Italian-language surnames